Richard Lutwyche (1949 – 2021) was a British author. He organised the first meeting of the Gloucestershire Old Spots Breeders Club.

In 1996, he joined the Rare Breeds Survival Trust as marketing director.

Books
The Pig: A Natural History (Princeton University Press, 2019)
Pig Keeping (National Trust, 2010) 
Higgledy-Piggledy (Quillar Press, 2010)

References

1949 births
2021 deaths
British non-fiction writers
People from Gloucestershire